Grabher is a surname of German-language origin. The 2010 United States Census found 182 people with the surname Grabher, making it the 99,378th-most-common name in the country. This represented an increase from 158 (104,819th-most-common) in the 2000 Census.

People
 Gerd Grabher (born 1953) Austrian football referee
 Gernot Grabher (born 1960), Austrian economic geographer
 Pius Grabher (born 1993), Austrian footballer
 Julia Grabher (born 1996), Austrian tennis player

References

German-language surnames